The 2010 ITF Men's Circuit was the 2010 edition of the third tier tour for men's professional tennis. It was organised by the International Tennis Federation and was a tier below the ATP Challenger Tour. During the months of October and December were played 91 tournaments with the majority being played in the month of October.

Key

October

November

December

References

 10-12